Stevanović is a Serbian surname, derived from the male given name Stevan (Stephen). It may refer to:

 Alen Stevanović, Swiss-born Serbian footballer
 Borislav Stevanović, Serbian footballer
 Dalibor Stevanovič, Slovenian footballer
 Goran Stevanović, Serbian footballer
Ivan Stevanović (footballer) (born 1983), Serbian footballer
Ivan Stevanović (handballer) (born 1982), Croatian handball player
 Jovana Stevanović (born 1992), Serbian volleyball player
 Ljubiša Stevanović (1910–1978), Yugoslav footballer
 Mihailo Stevanović (linguist) (1903–1991), Serbian linguist
 Miroslav Stevanović (born 1990), Bosnian footballer
 Natalija Stevanović (born 1994), Serbian tennis player
 Saša Stevanović (born 1974), Serbian footballer
 Vidosav Stevanović, Serbian writer

See also
 

Serbian surnames
Patronymic surnames
Surnames from given names